Leptothrix may refer to:

 Leptothrix (bacterium), a genus of bacteria in the order Burkholderiales
 Leptothrix (spider), a genus of spiders in the family Linyphiidae